There have been two NASCAR races named O'Reilly 200 or O'Reilly 200 presented by Valvoline:

O'Reilly 200 (Memphis), held at Memphis Motorsports Park from 2003 to 2008
O'Reilly 200 (Bristol), held at Bristol Motor Speedway from 2007 to 2011

See also
 O'Reilly Auto Parts 200 (disambiguation)
 UNOH 200